Lightfoot may refer to:

 Lightfoot (surname)
 Lightfoot (lacrosse), Native American lacrosse player
 Lightfoot, Virginia, an area of York County that is west of Williamsburg, VA
 Operation Lightfoot, part of the Second Battle of El Alamein
 Lightfoot House, a Grade II listed building in the UK named after the bishop
 Light-foot, the time taken for light to travel one foot; List of unusual units of measurement#Light-distance
 Lori Lightfoot, 56th Mayor of Chicago

Entertainment
 Ardy Lightfoot, a 1993 Super NES game
 Sammy Lightfoot, a 1983 multiplatform video game by SierraVision
 Lightfoot (Transformers), an Autobot character from the Transformers fictional series
 Lightfoot (G.I. Joe), a fictional character in the G.I. Joe universe
 Captain Lightfoot, a 1955 film starring Rock Hudson
 Thunderbolt and Lightfoot, a 1974 film starring Clint Eastwood
 Lightfoot!, the 1966 debut album by Gordon Lightfoot
 Light-Foot, a 1959 jazz album by Lou Donaldson
 "Lightfoot", a song by The Guess Who from Wheatfield Soul
Gordon Lightfoot, Canadian singer-songwriter
Prince Lightfoot, one of the main characters of The Unicorn Chronicles book series; a unicorn who is the dearest friend of Cara Diana Hunter

See also 

 Gary "Litefoot" Davis, American actor and businessman
 Footlight (disambiguation)